Alexandru Piftor (born 9 May 1999) is a Romanian professional footballer who plays as a midfielder for CSC Dumbrăvița.

References

External links
 
 
 

1999 births
Living people
Sportspeople from Botoșani
Romanian footballers
Association football midfielders
Liga I players
FC Botoșani players
AFC Chindia Târgoviște players
Liga II players
FC Gloria Buzău players
FC Ripensia Timișoara players
CSC Dumbrăvița players
21st-century Romanian people